The 1949 World Table Tennis Championships – Corbillon Cup (women's team) was the ninth edition of the women's team championship. 

United States won the gold medal defeating England 3–1 in the final. France and Hungary won bronze medals after finishing second in their respective groups.

Medalists

Final tables

Group A

  Egypt scratched from Group A

Group B

  Romania and  Switzerland scratched from Group B

Final

See also
List of World Table Tennis Championships medalists

References

-
1949 in women's table tennis